Gunner's Mate Charles J. Bibber (born 1838) was an American sailor who fought in the American Civil War.

Biography
Bibber was born in Portland, Maine. He enlisted into the navy on 2 May 1864. Bibber was aboard the  when it exploded near Fort Fisher on December 23, 1864. The crew skillfully assisted in towing the powder boat to shore before it was detected by the enemy. He received the Medal of Honor for his action during this event.

Medal of Honor citation

See also

List of American Civil War Medal of Honor recipients: A–F

References

1838 births
People of Maine in the American Civil War
Union Navy sailors
United States Navy Medal of Honor recipients
American Civil War recipients of the Medal of Honor
Military personnel from Portland, Maine
Year of death missing